Nemanja Ljubisavljević (born 26 November 1996) is a Serbian professional footballer who plays as a defender for Serbian club Vojvodina.

Club career

Prva Petoletka
Originating from Trstenik, Ljubisavljević started his career with local club Prva Petoletka in 2012–13 season in the Serbian League East at the age of 16. He noted 25 senior appearances between 2013 and 2014. Ljubisavljević earned an anterior cruciate ligament injury during the pre-season in a friendly match against Napredak Kruševac. After full recovery, he noted 4 appearances until the end of 2015–16 Serbian League East season. Ljubisavljević was involved in the incident after one duel with Andrija Radovanović during the match against Temnić on 24 October 2015. Playing for the club, Ljubisavljević made 37 appearances and scored 2 goals for 2 years as a bonus player in the Serbian League East at total as also the one cup match and several district cup matches.

Radnički Niš
After the whole 2016 he spent as a member of football club Jagodina, being also loaned to the satellite club Tabane Trgovački, Ljubisavljević moved to the Serbian top tier club Radnički Niš. Passing the trial period successfully, Ljubisavljević signed a four-year professional contract with the club. He was optionally loaned on dual registration to the Serbian First League side Dinamo Vranje until the end of 2016–17 season, where he made 3 appearances under coach Dragan Antić. Ljubisavljević made his official debut for Radnički Niš in last fixture match of the 2016–17 Serbian SuperLiga season against Red Star Belgrade at the Rajko Mitić Stadium on 21 May 2017 under coach Milan Rastavac.

Gorica
On 10 August 2017, Ljubisavljević moved to the Croatian Second Football League club Gorica, penning a two-year contract. He made his debut for new club in opening match of the 2017–18 campaign, against Dinamo Zagreb II. He scored his first goal for Gorica in the 5th fixture match for 1–0 victory over Hrvatski Dragovoljac on 9 September 2017. He also played Croatian Football Cup matches against Moslavina, GOŠK Dubrovnik. and Rijeka Ljubisavljević scored his second goal in 3–0 victory over Hajduk Split II on 10 March 2018. Securing promotion to the top tier of the Croatian football pyramid in 32nd fixture of the Croatian Second League, against Šibenik, Ljubisavljević won the competition with Gorica, after 1–0 victory over Dinamo Zagreb reserves in final game of the season. Next he missed the opening match of the 2018–19 campaign, against Rijeka as an unused substitution on the bench, Ljubisavljević made his debut in the Croatian First League on 4 August 2018, replacing Łukasz Zwoliński in 3–3 draw to Slaven Belupo.

Career statistics

Club

Honours
Gorica
2. HNL: 2017–18

 FK Žalgiris
 A Lyga: 2020, 2021, 2022
 Lithuanian Football Cup: 2021, 2022
 Lithuanian Supercup: 2020

References

External sources
 
 
 

1996 births
Living people
Sportspeople from Kruševac
Association football defenders
Serbian footballers
FK Jagodina players
FK Dinamo Vranje players
FK Radnički Niš players
Serbian First League players
Serbian SuperLiga players
Serbian expatriate footballers
Serbian expatriate sportspeople in Croatia
Expatriate footballers in Croatia
HNK Gorica players
First Football League (Croatia) players
Croatian Football League players